Trigonopterus acuminatus is a species of flightless weevil in the genus Trigonopterus from Indonesia.

Etymology
The specific name is derived from Latin acuminatus, meaning "pointed", and refers to the shape of its elytra.

Description
The holotype measured 3.14mm.  General coloration is black with rust-colored legs and antennae.

Range
T. acuminatus is native to the Indonesian province of East Java, on Mount Wilis.

References

acuminatus
Beetles described in 2014
Beetles of Asia
Insects of Indonesia
Endemic fauna of Indonesia